The 1896 North Dakota Agricultural Aggies football team was an American football team that represented North Dakota Agricultural College (now known as North Dakota State University) as an independent during the 1896 college football season. They had a 3-1-1 record. This was also their first season with games against teams other than North Dakota. Their final 3 games were in a 4-day period.

Schedule

References

North Dakota Agricultural
North Dakota State Bison football seasons
North Dakota Agricultural Aggies football